Gary Perchet (born 21 November 1983 in Oullins) is a French professional football player. Currently, he plays in the Championnat de France amateur for FC Montceau Bourgogne.

He played on the professional level in Ligue 2 for Amiens SC.

1983 births
Living people
French footballers
Ligue 2 players
Amiens SC players
AS Beauvais Oise players
AS Saint-Priest players
FC Montceau Bourgogne players
FC Gueugnon players
People from Oullins
Association football forwards
Sportspeople from Lyon Metropolis
Footballers from Auvergne-Rhône-Alpes